Sean P. Walsh (born February 24, 1950) is an American politician who served in the New York State Assembly from the 82nd district from 1977 to 1982.

References

1950 births
Living people
Democratic Party members of the New York State Assembly